Al-Shifa Hospital ( Mustashfa al-Shifa), properly known as Dar Al-Shifa Hospital ( Mustashfat dar al-Shifa) is the largest medical complex and central hospital in the Gaza Strip, located in the neighbourhood of North Rimal in Gaza City in the Gaza Governorate. The current director of the hospital is Dr. Muhammad Abu Salmiya.

History
Dar Al-Shifa, which means "house of healing" in Arabic, was originally a British Army barracks, but was transformed into a center to provide treatment for quarantine and febrile diseases by the government of the British Mandate of Palestine in 1946. Prior to the 1948 Arab-Israeli War, al-Shifa was the only hospital in Gaza. When the Egyptians administered the Gaza Strip after the war, the quarantine and febrile diseases department was relocated to another area in the city and al-Shifa developed into the central hospital of Gaza. Initially, a department for internal medicine was established, followed by a new wing for surgery, and subsequently new buildings for pediatrics and ophthalmology were added to the hospital. In 2013, a special surgical building was opened.

After a brief occupation by Israel during the 1956 Suez Crisis, the returning Egyptian administration, under directives by president Gamal Abdel Nasser, paid more attention to the health and social situation of Gaza, and al-Shifa was expanded to include departments for obstetrics and gynecology. They established a new health administration for the Gaza region, later building several clinics throughout the city that were attended by doctors from the hospital. The largest department in al-Shifa was internal medicine (100 beds), then pediatrics (70 beds), surgery (50 beds), ophthalmology (20 beds) and gynecology (10 beds).

Israeli occupation and Palestinian control
When Israel reoccupied Gaza in the 1967 Six-Day War, the entire Egyptian administration and staff in the hospital were taken prisoner. By 1969, the department of internal medicine grew to contain several sub-departments. The hospital underwent a major Israeli renovation in the 1980s as part of a showcase project to improve the living conditions of Gaza residents.

Much of the media coverage of the 2008–2009 Israel–Gaza conflict was broadcast or written by correspondents reporting from the hospital.

The two Norwegian medical doctors, Erik Fosse and Mads Gilbert, have done humanitarian work at the hospital.

Allegations of use as Hamas bunker
Several reports by Shin Bet officials (Yuval Diskin, Yitzhak Ilan) alleged that Hamas used Al-Shifa hospital as a bunker and refuge, knowing it will be spared by air-strikes. Ahmed Jabari was one of the leaders of Izz ad-Din al-Qassam Brigades alleged to have hidden there during the 2008–2009 Israel–Gaza conflict.

In 2009, The Palestinian Health Ministry, run by the Palestinian Authority in the West Bank, accused Hamas members of taking control of wards in Shifa Hospital, using them for interrogation and imprisonment, while withholding medical care.

During 2014, Operation Protective Edge, the hospital was described by The Washington Post as being a "de facto headquarters for Hamas leaders, who can be seen in the hallways and offices."
According to the WorldNetDaily, a conservative website
A Palestinian journalist reported for Libération that just a few meters from the emergency room a section was being used by Hamas as offices.
This report was removed by Liberation at the journalist's request for unknown reasons.

Reporting from the Gaza hospital to the Finnish Helsingin Sanomat Aishi Zidan reported that a rocket was fired in the middle of the night from a parking lot at the hospital.

During Operation Protective Edge, The Wall Street Journal correspondent Nick Casey tweeted a photo of Hamas MP and media spokesperson Mushir Al Masri using the outside of Shifa hospital for media interviews, but then later deleted it.

Against these reports has stood the testimony of the Norwegian medical doctor, Mads Gilbert. Danish translation from Norwegian (approx.): "Jeg har kunnet færdes frit på sygehuset og tage de billede, jeg ville og tale med dem, jeg ville. Jeg kan selvfølgelig ikke sige, at jeg har været i hver eneste krinkelkrog men når det gælder det, jeg og dr. Erik Fosse har set, så har vi ikke set, at det er et kommandocenter for Hamas."
 "I have been able to roam freely at the hospital and take the pictures that I wanted and talk to whomever I wanted. I can of course not say that I have been in every corner of the hospital, but concerning what I and Dr. Erik Fosse have seen, then none of us have seen that it is a command center for Hamas."

Dr. Gilbert has been accused by the Israeli authorities of facilitating propaganda for Hamas. Dr. Gilbert is also reported to have treated Izz ad-Din al-Qassam Brigades leader Ahmed Jabari as a patient at Shifa Hospital in 2009.

References

Bibliography

Hospitals in Gaza City
Hospitals established in the 1920s